1821 in sports describes the year's events in world sport.

Boxing
Events
 Tom Cribb retains his English championship but no fights involving him are recorded in 1821.

Cricket
Events
 In the Gentlemen v Players match at Lord's Cricket Ground, the Gentlemen concede the game having gone well behind on 1st innings.  Derek Birley comments that it is a Coronation Match to celebrate the accession of King George IV and "... a suitably murky affair".
England
 Most runs – Thomas Beagley 181 (HS 113*)
 Most wickets – Thomas Howard 13 (BB 7–?)

Football
England
 By this time, some form of order is beginning to be imposed on what has for centuries been a chaotic pastime played not so much by teams as by mobs.  This form of football, known more politely as "folk football", is essentially a public holiday event.  Shrove Tuesday is a traditional day for games across the country.  
 The games are generally thought to be free for alls with no holds barred and extremely violent.  As for kicking and handling of the ball, it is certain that both means of moving the ball towards the goals are in use.
 In the early nineteenth century, the public schools begin to devise their own versions, rules of which are verbally agreed and handed down over many years.  Each school (e.g., Eton, Harrow, Rugby, Winchester) has its own variations.

Horse racing
England
 1,000 Guineas Stakes – Zeal 
 2,000 Guineas Stakes – Reginald
 The Derby – Gustavus
 The Oaks – Augusta 
 St. Leger Stakes – Jack Spigot

References

Bibliography
 Derek Birley, A Social History of English Cricket, Aurum, 1999

 
1821